The prisons in Estonia are operated by the Estonian Department of Prisons, which currently maintains three prisons around the country: Tallinn Prison, Tartu Prison and Viru Prison.

In March 2011, there were 3,405 persons incarcerated in Estonia, and the number of prisoners per 100,000 residents were 254, which is the third highest rate in the EU. These figures include pre-trial detainees and remand prisoners. It is, however, a much lower rate than in the late 1990s and early 2000s, when the Estonian prison population reached almost 5,000 persons.

References